The 2009 Rally GB was the 12th and last round of the 2009 World Rally Championship season and the 65th running of the Rally of Great Britain. The rally consisted of 16 special stages.

Sébastien Loeb claimed victory to record a sixth successive world rally title.

Report 
Sébastien Loeb secured his sixth world title with a win at the season finale in Wales. His rival Mikko Hirvonen had to settle for second place and thus buried his dream of his first world title. Loeb came to Wales a point behind World Cup leaders Hirvonen. So the starting position was clear. The one who finishes ahead of the other in points is world champion.

Loeb and Hirvonen fought a second duel at the top on the first day. Loeb took the lead in the first stage. Hirvonen kept getting close, but couldn't dislodge him from the lead. The preliminary decision was made on Saturday morning. On stages eight and nine, Hirvonen struggled to find the right pace and lost time. The gap grew to 25 seconds. So Loeb went into the final Sunday with a lead of 30.2 seconds. However, Hirvonen did not give up and reduced the gap to Loeb to 18.2 seconds in the first two special stages.

On the penultimate special stage, the bonnet of Hirvonen's Ford came off. On a full-throttle section, it flipped up and blocked the Finn's view. Hirvonen had to stop and remove the hood. That took him about a minute. Although Loeb had turbo problems on the last special stage, Hirvonen was no longer able to catch up with the Frenchman. Hirvonen was able to defend second place overall against Daniel Sordo, who finished third just behind him.

Results

Special stages

References

External links
Official website

GB
Rally GB
Rally GB